Little Dummy Lake is a lake in Barron County, Wisconsin, in the United States.

A boat landing offers recreational boaters access to the  lake. Little Dummy Lake is a 43 acre lake located in Barron County. It has a maximum depth of 44 feet. Visitors have access to the lake from a public boat landing. Fish include Panfish, Largemouth Bass and Northern Pike.

See also
List of lakes in Wisconsin

References

Lakes of Barron County, Wisconsin